The Lloyd Saunders Memorial Trophy is awarded annually to the top executive in the Western Hockey League. It is named for former broadcaster Lloyd Saunders.

Winners

See also
OHL Executive of the Year
John Horman Trophy - Quebec Major Junior Hockey League Executive of the Year

References

Western Hockey League trophies and awards